Manfred Buder (24 March 1936 – 7 April 2021) was a German ice hockey player, who competed for SG Dynamo Weißwasser. He won the bronze medal playing for the East Germany national ice hockey team at the 1966 European Championships. Buder also represented East Germany at the 1968 Winter Olympics in Grenoble.

References

1936 births
2021 deaths
Sudeten German people
People from Ústí nad Orlicí District
German ice hockey defencemen
Ice hockey players at the 1968 Winter Olympics
Olympic ice hockey players of East Germany